Hemp Museum may refer to:

 The Hemp Museum (album), a 1996 album by American rapper B-Legit
 Hemp Museum (Berlin), a museum in Germany
 Hemp Museum Gallery, a museum in Spain
 Hash, Marihuana & Hemp Museum, a museum in the Netherlands

See also
 Cannabis Museum (disambiguation)